Mitch Short is an Australian rugby union player who plays for the  in the Super Rugby competition.

Graduating from The Scots College, Sydney and representing Australian Schools in 2013, Mitch joined Randwick in 2014., Mitch has great speed off the mark and strong passing game, Mitch has great potential to make the step into rep rugby after he joined the Western Force during the 2017 season. Mitch signed with the NSW Waratahs in 2018 and made his run on debut for the club in Round 3 against the Sharks in Durban.

  His position of choice is scrum-half.

References 

Australian rugby union players
Living people
1995 births
Rugby union scrum-halves
New South Wales Country Eagles players
Western Force players
New South Wales Waratahs players
Sydney (NRC team) players
Racing 92 players
Rugby union players from Sydney